Conservation park is a type of specially protected status for land held by the Crown in New Zealand for conservation purposes. The status is set up under the Conservation Act 1987 and the parks are administered by the Department of Conservation (DoC).

, there were 54 conservation parks in New Zealand (including 36 forest parks), covering an area of 2,690,191 hectares.

Forest parks

Forest parks have a less stringent level of protection than National Parks and are used for a wide variety of recreational and commercial activities.

Some forest parks have recently been renamed conservation parks, for instance, the former 'Whirinaki Forest Park' which became the Whirinaki Te Pua-a-Tāne Conservation Park in 2010.

Aorangi Forest Park
Coromandel Forest Park
Craigieburn Forest Park
Hanmer Forest Park
Herekino Forest Park
Houto Forest Park
Hukerenui Forest Park
Kaihu Forest Park
Kaiikanui Forest Park
Kaimanawa Forest Park
Kaweka Forest Park
Lake Sumner Forest Park
Marlborough Forest Park
Mataraua Forest Park
Maungataniwha Forest Park
Mount Richmond Forest Park
North-west Nelson Forest Park
Omahuta Forest Park
Opua Forest Park
Pirongia Forest Park
Pukenui Forest Park
Puketi Forest Park
Pureora Forest Park
Raetea Forest Park
Remutaka Forest Park
Ruahine Forest Park
Ruapekapeka Forest Park
Russell Forest Park
Tangihua Forest Park
Tararua Forest Park
Victoria Forest Park
Waikino Forest Park
Waima Forest Park
Waipoua Forest
Warawara Forest Park
Whakarewarewa State Forest Park

Other conservation parks

There are 18 other conservation parks in New Zealand.

Ahuriri Conservation Park
Aotea Conservation Park
Catlins Conservation Park
Eyre Mountains/Taka Rā Haka Conservation Park
Hakatere Conservation Park
Hāwea Conservation Park
Ka Whata Tu o Rakihouia Conservation Park
Kaimai Mamaku Conservation Park
Korowai/Torlesse Tussocklands Conservation Park
Onekaka River Conservation Park
Oteake Conservation Park
Raukumara Conservation Park
Ruataniwha Conservation Park
Russell Forest Conservation Park
Te Kahui Kaupeka Conservation Park
Te Papanui Conservation Park
Whirinaki Te Pua-a-Tāne Conservation Park
Wires Road Access Conservation Park

The Sugar Loaf Islands Sanctuary is privately owned.

See also
Forest parks of New Zealand
Protected areas of New Zealand

References